Partulina redfieldi is a species of tropical air-breathing land snail, a terrestrial pulmonate gastropod mollusk in the family Achatinellidae. This species is endemic to the island of Molokai, Hawaii.

References

Endemic fauna of Hawaii
Partulina
Biota of Molokai
Gastropods described in 1853
Taxonomy articles created by Polbot